Ronald Harold Hardy (16 November 1919 – October 1991) was an English novelist and screenwriter. His first novel The Place of Jackals was published in 1954 to acclaim. Hardy drew on his experiences as a liaison officer in Indochina during World War II in the writing of this novel. A review in Time magazine claimed that the novel "establishes him as Graham Greene's No. 1 disciple."

Hardy won the 1962 James Tait Black Memorial Prize for his fifth novel Act of Destruction. Besides his nine works of fiction, he wrote one non-fiction book about the construction of the Uganda Railway entitled The Iron Snake.

Hardy was also a TV screenwriter, with Suspense and Armchair Theatre among his credits. He qualified as a Certified Public Accountant before turning to writing. He married Betty Beattie and they had a son called David.  After their marriage ended he married Joyce Cook and had two children, Christopher and Christine.

Works
 The Place of Jackals, 1954
 A Name Like Herod, 1955
 Kampong, 1957
 The Men from the Bush, 1959
 Act of Destruction, 1962 
 The Iron Snake, 1965 (non-fiction)
 Return to Arms, 1967
 The Savages, 1967
 "The Face of Jalanath",1973
 Rivers of Darkness, 1979
 The Wings of the Wind, 1987

External links
 Time magazine review of The Place of Jackals 

1919 births
1991 deaths
James Tait Black Memorial Prize recipients
20th-century English novelists